Burma Army may refer to:

Myanmar Army, the current armed forces of Burma (Myanmar), also its predecessors:
Royal Burmese armed forces, army of Burma under native dynasties until 1885
British Burma Army (1 Apr. 1937 – 7 Sept. 1945), army created when Burma was separated from the British Raj (India)
Burma Independence Army (28 Dec. 1941 – 24 July 1942), army created by Japan to assist in its conquest of Burma
Burma Defence Army (26 Aug. 1942 – 1 Aug. 1943), re-organized Burma Independence Army
Burma National Army (1 Aug. 1943 – 7 Sept. 1945), army of the Japanese-sponsored State of Burma, which later turned on the Japanese (27 Mar. 1945)
 Patriotic Burmese Forces, Allied name (after 23 June 1945) for the Burma National Army after it turned on the Japanese
Japanese Burma Area Army (27 Mar. 1943 – 15 Aug. 1945), a Japanese force during World War II